Rosamunde is an 1823 play by Helmina von Chézy with incidental music by Schubert, see Rosamunde (Schubert)
Rosamunde String Quartet (String Quartet No. 13, Op. 29, D. 804) also by Schubert based on the same musical theme
The German string quartet ensemble Rosamunde Quartett, named after Schubert's string quartet
Impromptu No. 3 in B-flat major by Schuberet, also based on the same theme

It can also refer to: 
 Rosamunde (German song), 1934 German lyrics Klaus S. Richter and 1927 melody "Modřanská polka" by Jaromír Vejvoda, 1939 known as the Beer Barrel Polka.
Rosamunde (Schweitzer), 1780 singspiel by Anton Schweitzer
 540 Rosamunde, an asteroid
 Rosamunde Pilcher (1924−2019), British novelist

See also
 Rosamund (disambiguation)
 Rosamond (disambiguation)